Amnibacterium kyonggiense is a Gram-positive and non-motile bacterium from the genus of Amnibacterium which has been isolated from the Anyang stream in Korea.

References

Microbacteriaceae
Bacteria described in 2011